Lincoln Child (13 October 1957) is an American author of techno-thriller and horror novels. Though he is most well known for his collaborations with Douglas Preston (including the Agent Pendergast series and the Gideon Crew series, among others), he has also written seven solo novels, including the Jeremy Logan series. Over twenty of the collaborative novels and most of his solo novels have become New York Times bestsellers, some reaching the #1 position. Child and Preston's first novel together, Relic, was adapted into a feature film. Their books are notable for their thorough research and scientific accuracy.

Life and career
Born in Westport, Connecticut, but now a Florida resident, Child graduated from Carleton College in Northfield, Minnesota, with a major in English.

Soon afterward, in 1979, he secured a job as an editorial assistant at St. Martin's Press. By 1984, Child had become full editor. While in this position, he edited hundreds of books, most titles being American and English fiction.

In 1987, after founding the company's mass-market horror division, Child left the St. Martin's Press to become a systems analyst at MetLife. Child's first novel (co-written with Preston), Relic, was published in 1995. He left the company a few years later to write full-time.

In 2002, Child began his solo career with the debut novel Utopia, then wrote Death Match in 2004. These two novels were stand-alone works that introduced a new set of characters each time. However, with Deep Storm in 2007, Child introduced the character of Dr. Jeremy Logan, a Yale professor of medieval history and enigmalogist, whose role over the course of the series gradually increases with each book. He appeared in only one chapter in Deep Storm, then became a supporting character in Terminal Freeze (2009), before finally becoming the main protagonist in The Third Gate (2012). Utopia, Deep Storm, and Terminal Freeze all went on to become New York Times best sellers.

Child is now a resident of Sarasota, Florida.

Bibliography

Solo works

Stand-alone novels

 Utopia (2002)
 Death Match (2004)

Jeremy Logan series
 Deep Storm (2007)
 Terminal Freeze (2009)
 The Third Gate (2012)
 The Forgotten Room (2015)
 Full Wolf Moon (2017)
 Chrysalis (2022)

Collaborations with Douglas Preston

Agent Pendergast series
 Relic (1995)
 Reliquary  (1997)
 The Cabinet of Curiosities (2002)
 Still Life with Crows (2003)
 Diogenes Trilogy
 Brimstone (2004)
 Dance of Death (2005)
 The Book of the Dead (2006)
 The Wheel of Darkness (2007)
 Cemetery Dance (2009)
 Helen Trilogy
 Fever Dream (2010)
 Cold Vengeance (2011)
 Two Graves (2012)
 White Fire (2013)
 Blue Labyrinth (2014)
 Crimson Shore (2015)
 The Obsidian Chamber (2016)
 City of Endless Night (2018)
 Verses for the Dead (2018)
 Crooked River (2020)
 Bloodless  (2021)
 The Cabinet of Dr. Leng (2023)

Gideon Crew series
 Gideon's Sword (2011)
 Gideon's Corpse (2012)
 The Lost Island (2014)
 Beyond the Ice Limit (2016)
 The Pharaoh Key (2018)

Nora Kelly series
 Old Bones (2019)
 The Scorpion's Tail (2021)
 Diablo Mesa (2022)
 Dead Mountain (2023)

Other
 Mount Dragon (1996)
 Riptide (1998)
 Thunderhead (1999)
 The Ice Limit (2000)

Short stories

 "Gone Fishing" from Thriller: Stories to Keep You Up All Night (2006)
 "Extraction" [eBook] (2012)
 "Gaslighted: Slappy the Ventriloquist Dummy vs. Aloysius Pendergast" [eBook] (2014)

See also
Vincent D'Agosta, another character from Child's novels

References

External links
 The Official Douglas Preston – Lincoln Child Web Site
 Lincoln Child Website
 

1957 births
Living people
American horror novelists
People from Morristown, New Jersey
People from Westport, Connecticut
Techno-thriller writers
Carleton College alumni
20th-century American novelists
21st-century American novelists
Novelists from Connecticut
Novelists from New Jersey
American male novelists
American science fiction writers
20th-century American male writers
21st-century American male writers